Starburst most often refers to:
 Starburst region, a generic term to describe a region of space with a much higher than normal star formation
 Starburst galaxy, a galaxy with an exceptionally high rate of star formation
 Starburst (candy), a brand of fruit-flavored candy

Starburst may also refer to:

Culture
 Starburst (Farscape), a means of faster-than-light propulsion in the television series Farscape

Publications
 Starburst (magazine), a British science fiction-related magazine, first published in 1977
 Starburst (Alfred Bester), a collection of short stories by science-fiction author Alfred Bester, 1958
 Starburst (Frederik Pohl), a science-fiction novel by Frederik Pohl, written as an expansion of his novella The Gold at the Starbow's End

Other uses
 Starburst (business), or corporate spin-off, the breaking up of a large company
 Starburst (symbol), a symbol consisting of a star surrounded by rays emanating from it
 Starburst (missile), a British man-portable surface-to-air missile (MANPADS)
 Fourteen-segment display or Starburst display, an alphanumeric display configuration
 StarBurst, an office suite of the early 1980s
 Clerodendrum quadriloculare, a tropical flowering plant that is also called a starburst
 Cross screen filter or Starburst filter, a type of lens filter that creates patterns of lines to radiate from bright points
 Diffraction spike, or a line radiating from a bright light source that can occur in a photograph or vision.
 Starburst amacrine cell
 Starburst anemone

See also